In mathematics, the relative interior of a set is a refinement of the concept of the interior, which is often more useful when dealing with low-dimensional sets placed in higher-dimensional spaces.

Formally, the relative interior of a set  (denoted ) is defined as its interior within the affine hull of  In other words,

Any metric can be used for the construction of the ball; all metrics define the same set as the relative interior.

A set is relatively open iff it is equal to its relative interior. Note that when  is a closed subspace of the full vector space (always the case when the full vector space is finite dimensional) then being relatively closed is equivalent to being closed.

For any convex set  the relative interior is equivalently defined as

Comparison to interior 

 The interior of a point is empty, but its relative interior is the point itself.

 The interior of a line segment on the 2D plane is empty, but its relative interior is the line segment without its endpoints.

 The interior of a disc in 3D space is empty, but its relative interior is the same disc without its circular edge.

Properties

See also

References

Further reading

 

Topology